Invitation is an album by pianist Kenny Barron which was recorded in late 1990 and first released on the Dutch Criss Cross Jazz label.

Reception 

In his review on Allmusic, Stephen Cook stated "Invitation finds Barron in full maturity as a writer and in the sympathetic company of tenor saxophonist Ralph Moore, bassist David Williams, and drummer Lewis Nash ... Throughout, Ralph Moore's choice tenor lines glide over the notes, Lewis Nash's tasteful drumming impressively anchors the group, and Barron's inventive solos ride atop the band in full stride. With great material, solid playing, and the full Criss Cross sound, Invitation ends up as one of Kenny Barron's finest outings of the 1990s".

Track listing 
All compositions by Kenny Barron except where noted.

 "Namely You" (Gene de Paul, Johnny Mercer) - 9:14
 "And Then Again" - 5:22
 "Dew Drop" - 4:39
 "Invitation" (Bronisław Kaper, Paul Francis Webster) - 7:41 	
 "Joanne Julia" - 7:09
 "Afternoon in Paris" (John Lewis) - 7:18
 "You Don't Know What Love Is" (Gene de Paul, Don Raye) - 8:41
 "Blue Monk" (Thelonious Monk) - 7:28

Personnel 
Kenny Barron – piano
Ralph Moore - tenor saxophone
David Williams – bass
Lewis Nash – drums

References 

Kenny Barron albums
1991 albums
Criss Cross Jazz albums
Albums recorded at Van Gelder Studio